Deroparia is a genus of tephritid  or fruit flies in the family Tephritidae.

Species
Deroparia reticulata (Munro, 1929)

References

Tephritinae
Tephritidae genera
Diptera of Africa